Josef Rauvolf (born 2 January 1953 in Cheb) is a Czech translator, journalist and writer. He has translated many Beat Generation into Czech language, such as Junkie, Naked Lunch and Queer by William S. Burroughs and Visions of Cody, The Dharma Bums and Good Blonde & Others by Jack Kerouac. He also translated Uptight about The Velvet Underground. He was awarded Josef Jungmann prize for his translation of Visions of Cody. In addition to his translation work, he also wrote a book about Czech singer-songwriter Jaromír Nohavica.

References

1953 births
Living people
Czech translators
People from Cheb
English–Czech translators